The Calico M960A is an American selective fully automatic submachine gun (SMG) based on the Calico M950 with the addition of an extending butt and a forward grip. It is chambered for the 9×19mm Luger which takes 50-round or 100-round helical magazine which fits on top of the rear of the receiver. The M960A was first produced in 1990, and its rate of fire is 750 rpm.

References

9mm Parabellum submachine guns
Roller-delayed blowback firearms
Submachine guns of the United States
Trial and research firearms of the United States